"I Rave You" is a song by Belgian house producer, DJ Basto. It was released in May 2012 as a single across Europe.

Track listings

Chart performance

Charts

References

2012 singles
Songs written by Basto (musician)
Spinnin' Records singles
2012 songs